Gadolin is a Finnish noble family. Notable people with the surname include:

 Alexander Gadolin, Finnish jurist
 Johan Gadolin, Finnish chemist
 Jakob Gadolin, Finnish Lutheran bishop and Johan Gadolin's father

See also
 2638 Gadolin, asteroid
 Gadolinite, silicate mineral
 Gadolinium, chemical element

Finnish noble families